Pōhutu Geyser is a geyser in the Whakarewarewa Thermal Valley, Rotorua, in the North Island of New Zealand. The name Pōhatu is derived from te reo Māori, although it has an unclear etymology  being translated as either 'big splash', 'explosion' or 'constant splashing'.

The use of geothermal bores for heating by nearby Rotorua has impacted on the activity of Pōhutu Geyser and other nearby geothermal features. After a decline in geothermal activity at Whakarewarewa, a programme in the late 1980s saw bores within  of the geyser being shut, leading to a pronounced increase in activity. This activity increase has concerned some scientists who have been involved with the field, who claim that the increased regularity of Pōhutu Geyser's eruptions may result in the system dying in the future.  Its crater is 50 centimetres in diameter.

References

Rotorua Lakes District
Geysers of New Zealand
Taupō Volcanic Zone
Landforms of the Bay of Plenty Region